Michael or Mike Pratt may refer to:

Mike Pratt (actor) (1931–1976), British actor and songwriter
Lord Michael Pratt (1946–2007), British author
Mike Pratt (basketball) (1948–2022), American basketball player, coach, and broadcaster
Mike Pratt (politician) (born 1948), Australian politician, member of the Australian House of Representatives for Adelaide
Michael Pratt (GC) (born 1954), Australian police officer and recipient of the George Cross
Mike Pratt (businessman), Canadian businessman, president of Best Buy Canada
Michael Pratt, owner of the defunct pornographic website GirlsDoPorn
Michael Pratt (American football), American football player